A list of the earliest Western films, by decade, released before 1920.

1890s

1894
 Annie Oakley
 Bucking Broncho
 Buffalo Bill
 Buffalo Dance
 Lasso Thrower
 Mexican Knife Duel
 Sioux Ghost Dance
These exhibition films are silent shorts directed and produced by William K. L. Dickson at Thomas Edison's Black Maria studio, with William Heise as cinematographer. The performers in each film were members of Buffalo Bill's Wild West show with Annie Oakley and Buffalo Bill themselves exhibiting their rifle shooting skills. The two dances featured members of the Sioux nation who are believed to have been the first Native Americans to perform on film. The lasso thrower was Vicente Oropeza and the stuntmen staging the knife fight were Pedro Esquivel and Dionecio Gonzales. Two real-life rodeo riders, Lee Martin and Frank Hammitt, featured in Bucking Broncho, which was filmed outside the studio.

1895
 A Frontier Scene (aka Lynching Scene)
 Indian Scalping Scene
Both of these films, which were scenes only, are believed lost. They were made by Alfred Clark for the Edison Manufacturing Company.

1899
 Kidnapping by Indians
This is a two-minute silent film drama shot in Blackburn, Lancashire, England by Mitchell and Kenyon. It is the earliest known dramatic work in the genre.
 Cripple Creek Bar-room Scene
 Poker at Dawson City
Both of these were scenes only, made by Canadian director James H. White.
 A Bluff from a Tenderfoot
Filmed by Frederick S. Armitage for the American Mutoscope and Biograph Company, this depicts a poker game and may be the first comedy western.

1900s

1901
 Stage Coach Hold-Up in the Days of '49 (Edison)

1903
 Alphonse and Gaston, No. 3 (American Mutoscope & Biograph)
 The Cowboy and the Lady (American Mutoscope & Biograph)
 The Great Train Robbery (Edison)
 Kit Carson (American Mutoscope & Biograph)
 The Pioneers (American Mutoscope & Biograph)
 Prairie Emigrant Train Crossing the Plains (Lubin Manufacturing Company)
 Stage Hold-Up (Selig Polyscope Company)
 Western Card Game (Lubin)

1904
 A Brush Between Cowboys and Indians (Edison)
 Bushranging in North Queensland (Limelight Department)
 Cowboy Justice (American Mutoscope & Biograph)
 The Great Train Robbery (Lubin)
 The Hold-Up of the Leadville Stage (Selig)
 Western Stage Coach Hold Up (Edison)

1905
 Life on the Circle Ranch (Circle Ranch Film Company)
 The Little Train Robbery (Edison)
 The Train Wreckers (Edison)

1906
 L'arrivo di Buffalo Bill a Roma
 Attack on Fort Boonesboro
 From Leadville to Aspen: A Hold-Up in the Rockies
 Holdup of the Rocky Mountain Express
 Ned Kelly and His Gang
 The Life of a Cowboy
 The Prospectors, a Romance of the Gold Fields
 The Secret of Death Valley
 The Squatter's Daughter
 The Story of the Kelly Gang

1907
 The Bandit King
 Robbery Under Arms (by Charles MacMahon)
 Robbery Under Arms (by J Tait and N Tait)

1908
 The Bank Robbery
 The Fight for Freedom
 The Girl and the Outlaw
 The Kentuckian (1908 film)
 The Red Girl
 The Red Man and the Child

1909
 Bill Sharkey's Last Game
 Comata, the Sioux
 The Cowboy Millionaire
 The House of Cards
 The Mended Lute
 The Red Man's View

1910s

1910
 Abernathy Kids to the Rescue
 Across the Plains
 Broncho Billy's Redemption
 In Old California
 The Two Brothers

1911
 The Abernathy Kids to the Rescue
 An Accidental Outlaw
 Across the Plains
 The Battle
 The Cowboy and the Lady
 The Indian Brothers
 Fighting Blood
 The Last Drop of Water
 The Last of the Mohicans (colonial Western)
 The Lonedale Operator
 Swords and Hearts
 The Telltale Knife
 Was He a Coward?

1912
 According to Law
 The Ace of Spades
 Algie the Miner
 The Belle of Bar-Z Ranch
 The Chief's Blanket
 Geronimo's Last Raid
 The Girl and Her Trust (remake of 'The Lonedale Operator')
 The Goddess of Sagebrush Gulch
 The Half-Breed's Way
 The Heart of an Indian
 His Only Son
 The Invaders
 The Massacre
 My Hero
 A Temporary Truce
 Under Burning Skies
 When the Heart Calls
 With the Enemy's Help

1913
 The Abandoned Well
 The Accidental Bandit
 The Accusation of Broncho Billy
 The Battle at Elderbush Gulch
 Broken Ways
 Calamity Anne's Beauty
 Calamity Anne's Inheritance
 During the Round-Up
 Hearts and Horses
 In the Secret Service
 An Indian's Loyalty
 Past Redemption
 The Ranchero's Revenge
 The Sheriff's Baby
 The Tenderfoot's Money
 Three Friends
 Two Men of the Desert

1914
 The Bargain
 The Girl Stage Driver
 Her Grave Mistake (considered lost)
 The Man from the East
 A Miner's Romance (considered lost)
 A Ranch Romance (considered lost)
 Rose of the Rancho
 The Spoilers
 The Squaw Man
 A Ticket to Red Horse Gulch
 The Tragedy of Whispering Creek (considered lost)
 The Virginian

1915
 Broncho Billy and the Baby
 Buckshot John
 The Desert Breed (considered lost)
 The Girl of the Golden West
 The Heart of a Bandit
 Keno Bates, Liar
 The Passing of the Oklahoma Outlaws
 The Ring of Destiny
 The Slave Girl
 The Stagecoach Driver and the Girl

1916
 According to St. John
 Accusing Evidence
 The Apostle of Vengeance
 The Committee on Credentials
 For the Love of a Girl
 Hell's Hinges
 A Knight of the Range
 Lass of the Lumberlands
 Liberty (presumed to be lost)
 Love's Lariat
 The Night Riders
 The Passing of Hell's Crown
 The Return of Draw Egan
 Stampede in the Night
 The Three Godfathers
 The Wire Pullers
 A Woman's Eyes

1917
 A 44-Calibre Mystery
 The Almost Good Man
 The Bad Man of Cheyenne
 Blood Money
 The Drifter
 The Dynamite Special
 The Empty Gun
 The Fighting Gringo
 The Fighting Trail
 Goin' Straight
 The Golden Bullet
 Hair-Trigger Burke
 Hands Up!
 The Honor of an Outlaw
 The Little Moccasins
 A Marked Man (considered lost)
 The Mysterious Outlaw
 The Narrow Trail
 The Outlaw and the Lady
 A Romance of the Redwoods
 Roped In
 The Scrapper (considered lost)
 The Silent Man
 Single Shot Parker aka 'The Heart of Texas Ryan'
 Six-Shooter Justice
 The Soul Herder (considered lost)
 Squaring It
 Straight Shooting
 The Texas Sphinx
 The Tornado (considered lost)
 Wild and Woolly
 The Wrong Man

1918
 The Branded Man
 Bucking Broadway
 The Grand Passion
 Hell Bent
 Out West
 Play Straight or Fight
 Revenge
 Riddle Gawne (partially lost)
 Riders of the Purple Sage
 Ruggles of Red Gap (considered lost)
 The Scarlet Drop (partially lost)
 The Squaw Man (partially lost)
 Three Mounted Men (considered lost)
 A Woman's Fool (considered lost)

1919
 Ace High
 Ace of the Saddle (considered lost)
 The Black Horse Bandit
 Bare Fists (considered lost)
 By Indian Post
 The Crooked Coin
 The Crow
 The Double Hold-Up
 Elmo the Mighty (considered lost)
 The Face in the Watch
 A Fight for Love (considered lost)
 The Fighting Brothers
 The Fighting Heart
 The Fighting Line
 The Four-Bit Man
 A Gun Fightin' Gentleman
 Gun Law
 The Gun Runners
 His Buddy
 The Jack of Hearts
 The Kid and the Cowboy
 Kingdom Come
 The Knickerbocker Buckaroo (considered lost)
 The Last Outlaw
 Lightning Bryce (horror Western)
 The Lone Hand
 Marked Men (considered lost)
 The Masked Rider (partially lost)
 The Outcasts of Poker Flat (considered lost)
 Partners Three
 Rider of the Law (considered lost)
 Roped (considered lost)
 Rustlers
 The Rustlers
 Scarlet Days
 The Tell Tale Wire
 Terror of the Range (considered lost)
 The Trail of the Holdup Man
 The Tune of Bullets
 A Western Wooing
 The Wilderness Trail

See also
 Lists of Western films

References

Western
Western
Western
1890